The men's singles table tennis event was part of the table tennis programme at the 2012 Summer Olympics in London. The event took place from Saturday 28 July to Thursday 2 August 2012 at ExCeL London. The tournament was a single elimination tournament with a third place playoff played between the two losing semi-finalists. In the 2008 event all three medals were won by Chinese athletes with Ma Lin taking gold.

The draw was conducted on 25 July 2012.

Qualification

Schedule
All times are British Summer Time (UTC+1).

Seeds
Seeds were based on the ITTF World Ranking lists published in July 2012 with a maximum of 2 players per country. The top 16 seeded players qualified directly to the third round.

  (champion, gold medalist)
  (final, silver medalist)
  (fourth round)
  (fourth round)
  (semifinals, fourth place)
  (third round)
  (fourth round)
  (semifinals, bronze medalist)
  (fourth round)
  (fourth round)
  (quarterfinals)
  (quarterfinals)
  (quarterfinals)
  (third round)
  (quarterfinals)
  (third round)

The players seeded from 17 to 32 qualified directly to the second round.

  (third round)
  (fourth round)
  (second round)
  (third round)
  (third round)
  (second round)
  (second round)
  (third round)
  (third round)
  (second round)
  (fourth round)
  (second round)
  (third round)
  (third round)
  (third round)
  (fourth round)

Draw

Finals

Top half

Section 1

Section 2

Bottom half

Section 3

Section 4

Preliminary rounds

Top half

Section 1

Section 2

Bottom half

Section 3

Section 4

References

External links
 London 2012 Olympic Games: The Official Report. The London Organising Committee of the Olympic Games and Paralympic Games. (2013).
 
 2012 Summer Olympics / Table Tennis / Singles, Men. Olympedia.

Men's singles
Men's events at the 2012 Summer Olympics